Aliabad (also Romanized as ‘Alīābād) is a village in Neyasar Rural District, Neyasar District, Kashan County, Isfahan Province, Iran. At the 2006 census, its population was 71, in 19 families.

References 

Populated places in Kashan County